Ali Mohamed Al Faz is a Nigerien professional footballer who plays as a midfielder for Israeli club Maccabi Haifa.

Club career

Early career
Mohamed started his career at AS FAN and made his debut in the senior team at the age of 17. In 2013, he joined the youth department of Bordeaux and practiced intermittently with the reserve team.

In the summer of 2015, he signed with Beitar Tel Aviv Ramla; on 7 September, he made his debut for the club in a 4–1 loss to Bnei Lod. On 19 February 2016, he scored his first goal in a 3–2 victory against Bnei Lod.

On 6 July, Mohamed signed a contract with Maccabi Netanya. On 17 March 2017, he scored his first goal for the club in a 4–0 win against Hapoel Katamon Jerusalem. Mohamed finished the season with one goal and five assists.

On 22 January 2018, Mohamed signed a new contract at Maccabi Netanya until the end of the 2019–20 season. In the new contract, his release clause was set at $2.5 million.

Beitar Jerusalem
On 10 June 2019, Mohamed signed a three-year contract with Beitar Jerusalem for a fee of €1.7 million. Upon his signing with the club, a sect of the club's fans named La Familia petitioned to have his Muslim-sounding name changed despite Mohamed being a Christian.

In November, Mohamed was subjected to racist abuse from his own fans during an open training session. The club's owner, Moshe Hogeg, came out in support of Mohamed, saying that the club would pursue legal action against La Familia and any of the club's fans that were found to have hurled racist abuse at the player.

International career
On 6 September 2013, Mohamed made his debut for the Niger national football team in a 0–1 home loss against Burkina Faso, during the 2014 FIFA World Cup qualification (CAF).

Personal life
Although his name indicates his Muslim origin (his late father's faith), Mohamed claimed to be a devout Christian (his mother's faith).

Mohamed also received a year-long Israeli residency status in August 2022.

Honours
Maccabi Netanya
 Liga Leumit: 2016–17

Beitar Jerusalem
 Toto Cup: 2019–20

Maccabi Haifa
 Israeli Premier League: 2021–22
 Toto Cup: 2021–22
 Israel Super Cup: 2021

References

1995 births
Living people
Nigerien footballers
People from Niamey
Association football midfielders
AS FAN players
FC Girondins de Bordeaux players
Beitar Tel Aviv Bat Yam F.C. players
Maccabi Netanya F.C. players
Beitar Jerusalem F.C. players
Maccabi Haifa F.C. players
Super Ligue (Niger) players
Liga Leumit players
Israeli Premier League players
Niger international footballers
Nigerien Christians
Nigerien expatriate footballers
Expatriate footballers in France
Expatriate footballers in Israel
Nigerien expatriate sportspeople in France
Nigerien expatriate sportspeople in Israel